Dimu or Dimow or Dimaow may refer to:
 Dimu, Khuzestan
 Dimu, Mazandaran